The 2010–11 season was East Fife's third consecutive season in the Scottish Second Division, having been promoted from the Scottish Third Division at the end of the 2007–08 season. They also competed in the Challenge Cup, League Cup and the Scottish Cup.

Summary
East Fife finished fifth in the Second Division. They reached the Quarter-Final of the Challenge Cup, losing 5–0 to Queen of the South. They reached the first round of the League Cup and the fourth round of the Scottish Cup.

Management
They started season 2010–11 under the management of Stevie Crawford. On 25 October 2010, Crawford resigned as manager but stayed with the club as a player. On 26 October 2010, John Robertson was appointed as manager.

Results and fixtures

Scottish Second Division

Scottish Challenge Cup

Scottish League Cup

Scottish Cup

League table

References

East Fife
2010andndash;11